Zenobi was a video game company that was known for its interactive fiction. The company was started by John Wilson in 1986 and continued in various forms until 2013.  The company produced and published adventure games for the ZX Spectrum (along with the Atari ST) range of home computers, operating as a commercial entity from 1986 to 1997, selling the titles by mail-order. Emulator images were also available for PC and Amiga users. In its later years Zenobi concentrated on emulator users and produced numerous compilation CDs and DVDs.

On September 1, 2018, for the first time in nearly thirty years, a new Zenobi-branded adventure game penned by John Wilson was made available for the ZX Spectrum: 'Ramsbottom Smith and The Quest For The Yellow Spheroid', a conversion to the Spectrum format of the original ADVENTURON version. John Wilson produced games for various platforms under the moniker Pension Productions until his death in 2021.

References

External links 
Games List
 (archived)
A Zenobi Interview with the Balrog

Interactive fiction
Defunct video game companies of the United Kingdom
Video game companies established in 1986
Video game development companies
Video game publishers
1986 establishments in England